Line 2 of Ningbo Rail Transit is a rapid transit line in Ningbo. It stretches from Ningbo Lishe International Airport in the southwest towards Zhenhai District in the northeast of the city and further run into Honglian station in Beilun District. The line started service on 26 September 2015.

Route
Line 2 is the second metro line in Ningbo. It starts near Ningbo Lishe International Airport and stretches eastwards as tunnels. After reaching Yage'er Avenue it turns northwards and passes Ningbo Textile City following which the route zigzags into Ningbo Coach Terminal and then goes eastwards while crosses Ningbo railway station, the main railway station of the city. Then the route extends northwards into Jiangbei District and turn eastwards until it reaches Lulin Market, where it turns into viaducts before reaching Zhenhai District. The line will go further into Honglian in the second phase of construction. Wulipai, Fengyuan and Congyuan Road stations opened on May 30, 2020. Zhaobaoshan and Honglian stations opened on December 1, 2022.

Opening timeline

Stations

References

02
Railway lines opened in 2015
2015 establishments in China
Airport rail links in China